Istanbul became one of the world's most important Jewish centers in the 16th and 17th centuries. In marked contrast to Jews in Europe, Ottoman Jews were allowed to work in any profession and could also enter the Ottoman court. Ottoman Jews in Istanbul excelled in commerce, trade and came to particularly dominate the medical profession. Despite making up only 10% of the city population, Jews constituted 62% of licensed doctors in 1600.

History

1453 to 1700 
Before 1453, there were already functioning Karaite and Romaniote communities in Istanbul. Until 1688, the Romaniote community formed the majority in the city (55.6% of all Jews in 1608, 57% in 1623 and 27.8% in 1688). The fabric of the Ottoman Jewish society changed with waves of immigration of Ashkenazi, Sephardi, and Italian Jews, who all built separate and autonomous congregations. In the 16th and 17th centuries, a significant number of congregations named "Seniora" was founded by the financial support of Gracia Mendes Nasi for the anusim from Portugal settling in Istanbul. Ashkenazi Jews continued to settle in Istanbul in the 15th, 16th, 17th, and 20th centuries, and despite forming only 5.9% of all Jews in the city in 1608, they were slow to assimilate among the Sephardi Jews, who came to form the majority of Jews in Istanbul by 1688. 

In this period, there were many Jews who entered the Ottoman court. For instance, Hekim Jacob first entered the Ottoman court as the personal physician to Mehmed II and later became his financial adviser, translator, diplomat to Venice, treasurer, and later vizier. As a result of this distinguished service, Mehmed II bestowed a tax exemption to Hekim Jacob and his descendants in the Ottoman Empire. Using their political connections, Ottoman Jewish communities also exerted political pressure on foreign countries. For instance, responding to the burning of the anusim in Ancona in 1555, Gracia Mendes Nasi and Joseph Nasi convinced the Ottoman court to ban trade to Ancona and transfer the Ottoman mercantile representatives to the city Pesaro.

1700 to 1800 
In the 18th century, the Ottoman Jews of Istanbul suffered economic disadvantages because of growing economic competition with the European-backed Christians, who were able to compete unfairly through a series special advantages granted to them through capitulations of the Ottoman Empire. For instance, the French settlers in the city had many additional economic rights, were protected by foreign ambassadors, and also benefited from preferential tax rates.

In spite of the economic decline of the community, local Jews still were in prominent positions. By 1800, Ottoman Jews made up 5% of the city and 27% of all licensed physicians in Istanbul. In the 1700s, using the printing press, books came to be published in Spanish and Ladino.

1800 to 1923 
In the 19th century there was a general atmosphere of tolerance between Jews and Turks. However, the relations of the Jewish community with Christians were usually bad.  Following the death of the Greek Patriarch, the three Jewish physicians who cared for him were lynched and the subsequent Greek rioting injured an estimated 5,000 Jews. In 1856, a blood libel case occurred at Balat, where a mob of Greeks and Armenians started attacking Jewsand looting Jewish businesses.

See also 
 History of the Jews in the Ottoman Empire
 History of the Jews in Turkey

References 

History of Istanbul
Istanbul
Jews and Judaism in Istanbul
Religion in Istanbul